Patrick Baudisch is a computer science professor and the chair of the Human Computer Interaction Lab at Hasso Plattner Institute, Potsdam University. While his early research interests revolved around natural user interfaces and interactive devices, his research focus shifted to virtual reality and haptics in the late 2000s and to digital fabrication, such as 3D Printing and Laser cutting in the 2010s. Prior to teaching and researching at Hasso Plattner Institute, Patrick Baudisch was a research scientist at Microsoft Research and Xerox PARC. He has been a member of CHI Academy since 2013, and an ACM distinguished scientist since 2014. He holds a PhD degree in Computer Science from the Department of Computer Science of the Technische Universität Darmstadt, Germany.

Current Research Interest: Personal Fabrication 
Baudisch's main research interest lies in digital fabrication, largely focussing on software systems that allow users to design and fabricate physical objects using 3D printers (such as Trussfab  and http://brickify.it) and laser cutters (https://kyub.com).

Baudisch's publications focus on conference papers at ACM CHI and ACM UIST.

An overview of Baudisch's research agenda on personal fabrication can be found in Patrick Baudisch and Stefanie Mueller (2017), "Personal Fabrication", Foundations and Trends in Human–Computer Interaction: Vol. 10: No. 3–4, pp 165–293. http://dx.doi.org/10.1561/1100000055

Research Interest prior to 2012 
Baudisch's research interests are natural user interfaces and interactive devices, which include miniature mobile devices, touch input, interactive floors, and interactive rooms.

From this era, his five most cited publications on Google Scholar Citations are: Precise selection techniques for multi-touch screens, Halo: a technique for visualizing off-screen objects, Shift: a technique for operating pen-based interfaces using touch, drag-and-pop and drag-and-pick: Techniques for accessing remote screen content on touch-and pen-operated systems and Lucid touch: a see-through mobile device.

Precise selection techniques for multi-touch screens 
The paper Precise selection techniques for multi-touch screens was published on April 4, 2006, by Hrvoje Benko, Andrew D Wilson and Patrick Baudisch, totally cited 530 times.

The paper presents five techniques called Dual Finger Selections to leverage multi-touch sensitive displays to help users select very small targets on display. This is to resolve the issues, in the terms of touch screen interactions, introduced by factors such as large finger size and the lack of sensing precision. To make use of the techniques, a user would adjust the control-display ratio using a secondary finger, while controlling the cursor movements using the primary finger. The paper also introduces SimPress, a clicking technique, which reduces motion errors during the process of clicking as well as enable hovering state on devices that are not able to support proximity.

The user study in paper reported that in terms of error rate reduction, the 3 chosen techniques (Stretch, X-Menu, and Slider) outperformed the control technique and were favoured by the participants. Among the chosen techniques Stretch, X-menu and Slider, Stretch has the best performance and preference overall.

Halo: a technique for visualizing off-screen objects 

The paper Halo: a technique for visualizing off-screen objects was published on April 5, 2003, by Patrick Baudisch and Ruth Rosenholtz, totally cited 453 times.

The paper introduces Halo, a visualization technique that shows users the location of off-screen objects, to enable spatial cognition. Halo achieves this by showing parts of rings in border region of the display to indicate off screen objects. Users can then identify the exact location of the off-screen objects based on the location and portion of the rings that are visible.

The paper reported that users completed tasks 16-33% faster, giving no significant differences on error rates within the scope of the study.

Shift: a technique for operating pen-based interfaces using touch 

The paper Shift: a technique for operating pen-based interfaces using touch was published on April 29, 2007 by Daniel Vogel and Patrick Baudisch, totally cited 429 times.

The paper proposes Shift, a pointing technique, so that users can touch target points on screens designed for styluses with high precision using their fingers rather than a stylus. Shift reduces targeting times and error rates by showing a copy of the targeted screen area at a separate location. Shift also shows a pointer to the actual selection point of the finger. Note that Shift is only enabled when the users find it necessary so that users have the option to have the conventional touch screen experience.

Report results show that participants' actions have much lower error rates than an ordinary touch screen, and shorter times overall for larger targets compared to Offset Cursor.

Drag-and-pop and drag-and-pick: Techniques for accessing remote screen content on touch-and pen-operated systems 
The paper Drag-and-pop and drag-and-pick: Techniques for accessing remote screen content on touch-and pen-operated systems was published in August 2003 by Patrick Baudisch, Edward Cutrell, Dan Robbins, Mary Czerwinski, Peter Tandler, Benjamin Bederson and Alex Zierlinger, totally cited 405 times.

The paper presents interaction techniques Drag-and-pop and drag-and-pick, designed for display systems based on pen and touch interactions, and they grant users the access to see contents on screen that are otherwise not easy to reach. Drag-and-pop extends traditional drag-and-drop. More specifically, drag-and-pop responds to users by moving the potential target icons in users' cursor direction temporarily, so that users only need to move their hands on a smaller distance or scale. Drag-and-pick further extends drag-and-pop by activating icons such as to open folders or applications.

Results of the study report that drag-and-pop interface enables participants to file icons as fast as 3.7 times than the traditional drag-and-drop interaction on a 15' wide display.

Lucid touch: a see-through mobile device 

The paper Lucid touch: a see-through mobile device was published on October 7, 2007, by Daniel Wigdor, Clifton Forlines, Patrick Baudisch, John Barnwell and Chia Shen, totally cited 303 times.

The paper focus on the difficult aspects of touch screens: touching the small screen of a mobile device can be inconvenient because users' hands and fingers could block the contents they plan to interact with. This paper introduces LucidTouch, a mobile device that users control from the back. LucidTouch displays an image of users' hands on screen, so that it gives the illusion that LucidTouch is transparent when in fact it is not. Users are able to interact with targets with greater precision because of the pseudo-transparency. Furthermore, like an ordinary mobile touch screen, LucidTouch reacts to multiple touch points at the same time so users can perform multi-touch actions

Initial study results illustrate that because of factors such as improved accuracy, and unblocked view of the screen, many users prefer interactions with LucidTouch than interactions with conventional devices.

Awards

ACM Awards

ACM CHI Academy 
Patrick Baudisch was inducted into the CHI Academy in 2013.

ACM Distinguished Scientist 
Patrick Baudisch became an ACM distinguished scientist in 2014.

Recent Publication Awards

CHI 2015 Best Paper Award 
Winning Paper: Affordance++: allowing objects to communicate dynamic use

UIST 2013 Best Paper Award 
Winning Paper: Fiberio: A Touchscreen That Senses Fingerprints

CHI 2013 Best Paper Award 
Winning Paper: LaserOrigami: Laser-Cutting 3D Objects

CHI 2010 Best Paper Award 
Winning Paper:  Lumino: Tangible Blocks for Tabletop Computers Based on Glass Fiber Bundles

CHI 2007 Best Paper Award 
Winning Paper: Shift: A Technique for Operating Pen-Based Interfaces Using Touch

Students 
Patrick Baudisch's PhD students include:

 Christian Holz, now faculty at ETH Zurich
 Stefanie Mueller, now faculty at MIT
 Alexandra Ion, now faculty at CMU
 Pedro Lopes, now faculty at the University of Chicago 
 Lung-Pan Cheng, now faculty at National Taiwan University

References 

Academic Journal articles by quality
Computer scientists
Year of birth missing (living people)
Living people
Technische Universität Darmstadt alumni